The 2022 Cork Premier Junior Hurling Championship was the inaugural staging of the Cork Premier Junior Hurling Championship. The draw for the group stage placings took place on 8 February 2022. The championship ran from 29 July to 15 October 2022.

The final was played on 15 October 2022 at Páirc Uí Chaoimh in Cork, between Tracton and Ballygiblin, in what was their first ever meeting in the final. Ballygiblin won the match by 2-19 to 1-12 to claim their first ever championship title in the grade.

Participating teams

Group A

Group A table

Group A results

Group B

Group B table

Group B results

Group C

Group C table

Group C results

Knockout stage

Bracket

Relegation playoff

Quarter-finals

Semi-finals

Final

References

External links

 Cork GAA website

Cork Premier Junior Hurling Championship
Cork Premier Junior Hurling Championship